The Dutch Junior Open Squash 2017 is the men's edition of the 2017 Dutch Junior Open Squash, which is a World Junior Squash Circuit Tier 2 event. The event took place at the Frans Otten Stadion from July 13 to 16. Englishman Curtis Malik won his first Dutch Junior Open title after defeating American Charles Culhane in the Boys' Under 19 final in a tightly-contested, 72-minute five game encounter.

Seeds (Boys' Under 19)

Draw and results

Finals

Top half

Section 1

Section 2

Bottom half

Section 1

Section 2

See also
British Junior Open Squash 2017
French Junior Open Squash
2017 US Junior Open Squash Championships
World Junior Squash Championships

References

2017 in squash
Squash in the Netherlands
Squash tournaments in the Netherlands